Everybody is the second and final studio album by British pop group Hear'Say, formed through the ITV television show Popstars. It was released in the United Kingdom on 3 December 2001. The album peaked at No. 24 on the UK Albums Chart and spent five weeks in the Top 75 chart.

Track listing

2001 albums